Irvin Duguid (born 18 December 1969, in Aberchirder, Aberdeenshire) is a Scottish musician and composer.

He studied piano and violin at the Royal Scottish Academy of Music and Drama in Glasgow before going on to become keyboard player in the live line-up of Stiltskin, a rock band with the number 1 hit single "Inside" in the UK in 1994.

Duguid went on to work with other Scottish acts such as Gun (later to change their name to g.u.n. in the wake of the Dunblane massacre) and then Fish (ex-Marillion vocalist). Duguid has since appeared on several albums by Stiltskin's old vocalist Ray Wilson, who for a short time in the late 1990s was lead singer with Genesis.

In 2004 he worked on some demo material with Paolo Nutini and appeared as Paolo's keyboard player at 2 events, a live BBC Radio Scotland session and a gig at King Tut's Wah Wah Hut.
In 2006 he began writing songs with singer Louise Rutkowski, 7 years later in 2013 had finished an album of work (Diary of a Lost Girl) which was funded by Pledge Music and finally released in 2014.

2007 saw Duguid producing the double album Duan Nollaig by Fiona Mackenzie. This was released on the Greentrax record label and is believed to be the first such collection of Christmas songs and Carols in the Gaelic language. He also arranged most of the 35 songs and played piano on about half of these. Scots singer Karen Matheson was one of the guest vocalists on the album.

Duguid has appeared as a keyboard player on many UK touring musicals including We Will Rock You, The Producers, The Full Monty and on The Bodyguard in London.

TV Composer
My Life in Books, Anne Robinson, BBC, 2011
Quiz show pilot, BBC, 2011

Discography
 Diary of a Lost Girl, Louise Rutkowski. 2014
The Lassies Reply, Pur. 2009
Deagh Dheis Aodaich (A Good Suit of Clothes), Fiona Mackenzie. 2009
Duan Nollaig, Fiona Mackenzie. 2007
She, Stiltskin. 2006
Ray Wilson Live, Ray Wilson. 2005
The River Sessions, Gun. 2005
Bouillabaisse, Fish. 2005
The Next Best Thing, Ray Wilson. 2004
Change, Ray Wilson. 2003
Field of Crows, Fish. 2003
Fool's Company (DVD), Fish. 2002
A Tribute to Frankie Miller, Various Artistes. 2002
The Mind's Eye (American release), Stiltskin. 1995

External links 
 Irvin Duguid homepage
 BBC biography
 

1969 births
Living people
People from Banff and Buchan
Alumni of the Royal Conservatoire of Scotland
Scottish keyboardists
Scottish pianists
Scottish violinists
British male violinists
British male pianists
21st-century pianists
21st-century violinists
21st-century British male musicians